The Trent College Ground is a cricket ground at Trent College in Long Eaton, Derbyshire, England. The ground has hosted five List A matches, all John Player League  matches involving Derbyshire, who played one match each year at the ground from 1975 to 1979, with an estimated 6,000 spectators packed into the ground for the Derbyshire vs Kent match on 6 July 1975. Evidence of cricket being played on Trent College grounds date back to 1869, with records revealing two matches that year (one of them against Appleby Grammar School). Trent won both matches.

Game information
{| class="wikitable"
|-
! Game Type
! No. of Games
|-
| County Championship Matches
| 0
|-
| limited-over county matches
| 5
|-
| Twenty20 matches
| 0
|}

One-day matches
{| class="wikitable"
|-
! Category
! Information
|-
| Highest Team Score
| Derbyshire (233/4 in 39.2 overs against Surrey) in 1978
|-
| Lowest Team Score
| Derbyshire (130/9 in 40 overs against Leicestershire) in 1977
|-
| Best Batting Performance
| Mark Faber (71 Runs for Sussex against Derbyshire) in 1976
|-
| Best Bowling Performance
| Peter Kirsten (5/34 for Derbyshire against Northamptonshire) in 1979
|}

References

External links
 Cricinfo Website - Ground Page
 Cricket Archive page

Cricket grounds in Derbyshire
Derbyshire County Cricket Club
Cricket in Derbyshire